Proximus TV channels are presented differently in the electronic programme guide (EPG) depending on which part of the country the subscriber is.  Namely in the capital region of Brussels, northern part of Belgium i.e. Flanders, or southern part of Belgium i.e. Wallonia

Television in Belgium
Belgian television-related lists